The Sino-Philippine Treaty of Amity was a treaty signed by the Republic of the Philippines and the Republic of China in 1947. The treaty contains provisions which ensures "perpetual peace and everlasting amity" between the two countries.

See also
Chinese Filipino
History of the Philippines

References

Treaties of the Philippines
Treaties concluded in 1947
Treaties of the Republic of China (1912–1949)
Philippines–Taiwan relations